The Argentina football champion is the winner of the highest league in Argentine football, the Primera División. The league season have had different formats, since the original double round-robin until the Superliga. The champion is the team with the most points at the end of the competition.

The first Argentine football champions, St. Andrew's and Old Caledonians, were crowned in 1891 in the first official championship. Alumni was the most successful club with 10 titles until its dissolution in 1911. River Plate is the most successful club, having won 37 titles to date.

Primera División champions (1891–present)
The following is a list including all the Primera División champions since the first edition held in 1891. For the first time since 1892, no league championship was held in 2020 after the schedule for a regular league season had been repeatedly delayed because of the COVID-19 pandemic. As the National Government allowed football competitions to return in October, AFA organised the 2020 Copa de la Liga Profesional, a domestic cup conceived as a contingency competition. 

Keys

Notes

Titles by club
The list include all the titles won by each club since the first Primera División championship held in 1891. Clubs in italic no longer exist or are currently disaffiliated from the AFA.
    
{| class="wikitable sortable"
|-
! Rank
! width=200px| Club
! width=50px | 
! width=50px | 
! width=800px| Winning seasons
|-
|align="center"|1
| River Plate || ||  || 1920 AAmF, 1932 LAF, 1936 (Copa Campeonato), 1936 (Copa de Oro), 1937, 1941, 1942, 1945, 1947, 1952, 1953, 1955, 1956, 1957, 1975 Metropolitano, 1975 Nacional, 1977 Metropolitano, 1979 Metropolitano, 1979 Nacional, 1980 Metropolitano, 1981 Nacional, 1985–86, 1989–90, 1991 Apertura, 1993 Apertura, 1994 Apertura, 1996 Apertura, 1997 Apertura, 1997 Clausura, 1999 Apertura, 2000 Clausura, 2002 Clausura, 2003 Clausura, 2004 Clausura, 2008 Clausura, 2014 Final, 2021
|-
|align="center"|2
| Boca Juniors || || ||  1919, 1920, 1923, 1924, 1926, 1930, 1931 LAF, 1934 LAF, 1935, 1940, 1943, 1944, 1954, 1962, 1964, 1965, 1969 Nacional, 1970 Nacional, 1976 Metropolitano, 1976 Nacional, 1981 Metropolitano, 1992 Apertura, 1998 Apertura, 1999 Clausura, 2000 Apertura, 2003 Apertura, 2005 Apertura, 2006 Clausura, 2008 Apertura, 2011 Apertura, 2015, 2016–17, 2017–18, 2019–20, 2022
|-
|align="center"|3
|Racing|| || ||  1913, 1914, 1915, 1916, 1917, 1918, 1919 AAmF, 1921 AAmF, 1925 AAmF, 1949, 1950, 1951, 1958, 1961, 1966, 2001 Apertura, 2014 Transición, 2018–19
|-
|align="center"|4
| Independiente || || ||  1922 AAmF, 1926 AAmF, 1938, 1939, 1948, 1960, 1963, 1967 Nacional, 1970 Metropolitano, 1971 Metropolitano, 1977 Nacional, 1978 Nacional, 1983 Metropolitano, 1988–1989, 1994 Clausura, 2002 Apertura
|-
|align="center"|5
| San Lorenzo || || ||  1923 AAmF, 1924 AAmF, 1927, 1933 LAF, 1936 (Copa de Honor), 1946, 1959, 1968 Metropolitano, 1972 Metropolitano, 1972 Nacional, 1974 Nacional, 1995 Clausura, 2001 Clausura, 2007 Clausura, 2013 Inicial
|-
|align="center" rowspan="2"|6
| Vélez Sarsfield || || ||  1968 Nacional, 1993 Clausura, 1995 Apertura, 1996 Clausura, 1998 Clausura, 2005 Clausura, 2009 Clausura, 2011 Clausura, 2012 Inicial, 2012–13 Superfinal 
|-
|Alumni || || || 1900, 1901, 1902, 1903, 1905, 1906, 1907, 1909, 1910, 1911
|-
|align="center" rowspan="2"|7
| Estudiantes (LP) || || ||1913 FAF, 1967 Metropolitano, 1982 Metropolitano, 1983 Nacional, 2006 Apertura, 2010 Apertura
|-
| Newell's Old Boys || || ||1974 Metropolitano, 1987–88, 1990–91, 1992 Clausura, 2004 Apertura, 2013 Final
|-
|align="center" rowspan="2"|8
| Huracán || || || 1921, 1922, 1925, 1928, 1973 Metropolitano
|-
|Lomas Athletic ||align=center| 5 ||align=center| 2 ||  1893, 1894, 1895, 1897, 1898
|-
|align="center"|9
|Rosario Central || || || 1971 Nacional, 1973 Nacional, 1980 Nacional, 1986–87
|-
|align="center" rowspan="2"|10
|Belgrano Athletic ||align=center| 3 ||align=center| 3 ||  1899, 1904, 1908
|-
| Argentinos Juniors ||align=center| 3 ||align=center| 2 ||  1984 Metropolitano, 1985 Nacional, 2010 Clausura
|-
|align="center" rowspan="5"|11
| Lanús || || || 2007 Apertura,  2016
|-
| Ferro Carril Oeste || || ||  1982 Nacional, 1984 Nacional
|-
| Porteño || || ||  1912 FAF, 1914 FAF
|-
| Quilmes || ||||1912, 1978 Metropolitano
|-
|Estudiantil Porteño || || ||1931, 1934
|-
|align="center" rowspan="9"|12
| Gimnasia y Esgrima (LP) || || ||  1929
|-
| Banfield || || ||  2009 Apertura
|-
|Lomas Academy || || || 1896
|-
| Arsenal ||align=center| 1 ||align=center| – ||  2012 Clausura
|-
| Chacarita Juniors || || ||  1969 Metropolitano
|-
| Dock Sud || || ||  1933
|-
|Old Caledonians ||align=center| 1  ||align=center| – ||  1891
|-
| Sportivo Barracas || || ||   1932
|-
|St. Andrew's |||| ||  1891
|}
Notes

 Championships defined by final 
Although most of Primera División championships were decided by points in single and double round-robin tournaments, some finals were played when two teams ended tied on points at the end of the season. The following is a list of those cases:Notes''':
 The 1936 "Copa de Oro" is not listed because it did not define a Primera División champion but which team would participate in the 1936 Copa Aldao.
 Nacional championship finals are listed on their respective article and not included here.
 Copa Campeonato matches are not included because they had the format of national cup.

Notes

See also
 List of football clubs in Argentina by competitive honours won
 List of Argentine football national cups

References

champions
Argentina
Argentine Primera División